Stephen Keogh (born 10 May 1982) is a former Irish rugby union player.

Early life 
Keogh was born in Limerick, Ireland, and grew up in Dromkeen, County Limerick. He attended St. Munchin's College before playing in the second-row for Ireland U21s in the World Cup in Johannesburg in June 2002. In the following season, playing number 8, Keogh led the U21s to Six Nations Championship victories over Scotland, Italy, France and England. His side's only defeat that year came against eventual champions Wales, the Irish defeated by the narrowest of margins (20–19) in Ebbw Vale.

Professional career 
Keogh made his Munster senior debut in the Celtic League in October 2003 before we went on to play 54 senior games (45 Celtic League, 9 Heineken Cup), scoring 10 points (2 tries), and captained the side on two occasions. He has played twice for the Ireland 'A' side.

Keogh moved to Leinster during March 2006 and been an integral part of the Leinster pack since then, having played over 30 times. During the months of February and March 2007 having featured prominently in the victories over Edinburgh and Connacht and also shone in the Heineken Cup quarter-final defeat to Wasps at the end of March, was announced as the Bank of Scotland (Ireland) Leinster Player of the Month for February/March.

References

External links 
Profile on Leinster Rugby
Munster Profile

1982 births
Living people
Rugby union number eights
Irish rugby union players
Leinster Rugby players
Munster Rugby players
St Mary's College RFC players
Shannon RFC players
University College Cork RFC players
Rugby union players from County Limerick